Cardinal Hayes may refer to:

Patrick Joseph Hayes (1867–1938), fifth Archbishop of New York
Cardinal Hayes High School, in the Bronx, New York City, named after Patrick Cardinal Hayes